Copelatus chevrolati is a species of diving beetle. It is part of the genus Copelatus in the subfamily Copelatinae of the family Dytiscidae. It was described by Aubé in 1838. There are two described subspecies: C. c. chevrolati and C. c. renovatus.

Distribution
Copelatus chevrolati ranges across the southern and central United States from North Carolina west to California and Texas and Florida north to South Dakota and Michigan, with records from southern Ontario. Copelatus chevrolati renovatus is the western subspecies, whereas C. c. chevrolati is the eastern subspecies.

Description
They are distinguished from other North American Copelatus species by having 8 or 9 discal striae.

References

chevrolati
Beetles described in 1838
Endemic fauna of the United States
Taxa named by Charles Nicholas Aubé